Cyclekart is a type of gokart racing where competitors drive single-seat cars styled to resemble race cars from the 1920s and 1930s.

Cyclekarts are compact, lightweight, sports machines, home and hand made by their drivers for the pursuit of classic motoring sporting excitement. They are not built to be serious race machines or show cars. They're built purely for the personal satisfaction and fun and of driving a machine you've built yourself. As driving machine, the cyclekart formula loosely limits certain aspects of the machines to maintain good sporting performance without jeopardising the light-hearted nature of these machines and the people who build them.

Cyclekarts and their builders don't like to take things too seriously, but do encourage good, sporting competitions for fun. The cyclekart specifications allow for all the cars built being similar in performance, without strictly governing the rules.

Cyclekarts are generally not for sale, as they should be an expression of the owner's individual styling interests as well as sharing the pride in building one's own unique kart. Cyclekarts are built for the pleasure of the imagination, the design and the building of the kart. Cyclekarts are based on the styling of 1920s and 1930s race cars to pre-World War II. Making it look good is fundamental, performance is secondary in the cyclekarting community.

The mechanical design is a simplified version of a cyclecar. The formula specifies that a cyclekart is a one-seat car using Honda 17 x 1.75 or 2 inch rims, 2.50 x 17 tires, a 38-inch track, wheelbase as close to 66 inches as the aesthetics of the car will allow, weight no more than 250 lbs., and powered by a 200 cc, single cylinder, 6.5 hp Honda OHV engine (the GX200). A cyclekart should not cost more than $2100 to build in 2012 dollars and the driver is required to build his own car. Power is transmitted via a Comet TAV-30 unit to one wheel only. Braking is also on this same rear wheel by mechanical Comet disc.

References

External links
 An Introduction to CycleKarting - The origin
 CycleKart Club Videos - Collection of Cyclekart Videos
 Cycle-Kart-Design - Design of Cycle Karts Blog
CycleKarting in Great Britain - Forum

Kart racing